Lecithocera xanthocostalis is a moth in the family Lecithoceridae. It was described by Wadhawan and Walia in 2007. It is found in India.

References

Moths described in 2007
xanthocostalis
Moths of Asia